Chiasmocleis shudikarensis is a species of frog in the family Microhylidae.
It is found in Brazil, French Guiana, Guyana, Suriname, and possibly Peru.
Its natural habitats are subtropical or tropical moist lowland forests and intermittent freshwater marshes.
It is threatened by habitat loss.

References

Chiasmocleis
Taxonomy articles created by Polbot
Amphibians described in 1949